Jean Marie was a  coaster that was built in 1922 by F Schichau GmbH, Elbing, Germany as Tertia for German owners. A sale in 1925 saw her renamed Hornland. In 1926, a further sale saw her renamed Taube. She was seized by the Allies in May 1945, passed to the Ministry of War Transport (MoWT) and was renamed Empire Contour. In 1946, she was transferred to Belgium and renamed Jean Marie. She was sold into merchant service, serving until 1951 when she sank after her cargo shifted.

Description
The ship was built in 1922 by F Schichau GmbH, Elbing.

The engine was built by Schichau.

History
Tertia was built for the Flensburger Dampfschiffahrt Gesellschaft von 1869, Flensburg. In 1925, she was sold to the Dampfschiffs Rhederei Horn AG, Lübeck, and was renamed Hornland. In 1925, the company was taken over by Norddeutscher Lloyd, Bremen. Hornland was renamed Taube in 1926. The Code Letters LNRV were allocated.

In 1934, Taube was sold to Argo Line, Bremen. The Code Letters DOCE were allocated.  In May 1945, Taube was seized by the Allies at Flensburg. She was passed to the MoWT and renamed Empire Contour. Her port of registry was changed to London. The Code Letters GJBV and United Kingdom Official Number 180611 were allocated. She was placed under the management of William Coombs & Sons Ltd.

On 5 May 1947, Empire Contour was transferred to the Belgian Government and was renamed Jean Marie. She was placed under the management of Vloeberghs Reederij, Antwerp. On 10 May, she made her maiden voyage under the Belgian Flag, departing Antwerp for Copenhagen, Denmark. In December 1950, Jean Marie was sold to Vloeberghs Reederij. On 12 December 1951, her cargo of timber shifted while she was on a voyage from Kotka, Finland to Ostend, Belgium. Her crew of 20 were rescued by the Soviet cargo ship Imandra, which was on a voyage from Leningrad to Amsterdam, Netherlands. They were landed at Kiel, West Germany. The Swedish minesweeper  also responded, but arrived after Jean Marie had sunk.

References

1922 ships
Ships built in Elbing
Steamships of Germany
Merchant ships of Germany
World War II merchant ships of Germany
Ministry of War Transport ships
Empire ships
Steamships of the United Kingdom
Merchant ships of the United Kingdom
Steamships of Belgium
Merchant ships of Belgium
Maritime incidents in 1951
Ships built by Schichau